The Ford EX (informally known as the Ford Ex and Ford Extreme) is a concept car created by the Ford Motor Company. It was first introduced at the 2001 North American International Auto Show. The EX was built to be an off-road vehicle.

Engine and Design 
It has a five-speed manual transmission with four-wheel drive (4WD), and large 33-inch tires. The design of the vehicle is spare, as it has no doors. The exterior is mainly composed of a durable chrome-molybdenum steel exoskeleton, advantageous for its off-road capability.

Media
 The EX concept was featured in the 2004 live-action film Thunderbirds.
 The EX concept was featured as a playable car in the video games Ford Racing 2 and Ford Racing 3.

References 
High resolution image of the Ford EX
Ford EX information at ConceptCarz.com

EX